The King Cup (sometimes spelled King's Cup), officially known as The Custodian of the Two Holy Mosques' Cup, is the Saudi Arabian football knockout cup competition, run by the Saudi Arabian Football Federation.

The cup was created in 1957 and was played until 1990. It was re-launched again in 2007 as King's Cup of Champions, and was played by only the top 6 finishers of the Professional League plus the Crown Prince Cup and Federation Cup winners. Since 2014, it was renamed as King's Cup, the competition returned to its roots by implementing the old format. 153 clubs have taken part in the tournament.

Qualification and prize money
The cup winner will be guaranteed a place in the AFC Champions League.

Prize money:
 Final winners: 5,500,000 Saudi Riyals.
 Final runners-up: 4,000,000 Saudi Riyals.

Winners by year

Performance by club

Trophies

Source:

Finals

Source:

Hat-tricks

References

External links
King Cup SAFF 
Saudi Arabia - List of Cup Winners, RSSSF.com
 Champions Cup current season results and dates - Soccerway
 Saudi Champions Cup - Hailoosport.com (Arabic)
 Saudi Champions Cup - Hailoosport.com

 
1
Saudi Arabia